In enzymology, an icosanoyl-CoA synthase is an enzyme that catalyzes the chemical reaction

stearoyl-CoA + malonyl-CoA + 2 NAD(P)H + 2 H+  icosanoyl-CoA + CO2 + CoA + 2 NAD(P)+ + H2O

The 5 substrates of this enzyme are stearoyl-CoA, malonyl-CoA, NADH, NADPH, and H+, whereas its 6 products are icosanoyl-CoA, CO2, CoA, NAD+, NADP+, and H2O.

This enzyme belongs to the family of transferases, specifically those acyltransferases transferring groups other than aminoacyl groups.  The systematic name of this enzyme class is stearoyl-CoA:malonyl-CoA C-acyltransferase (decarboxylating, oxoacyl- and enoyl-reducing). Other names in common use include acyl-CoA elongase, C18-CoA elongase, and stearoyl-CoA elongase.

References

 
 
 

EC 2.3.1
NADPH-dependent enzymes
NADH-dependent enzymes
Enzymes of unknown structure